The 2009 United States state legislative elections were held on November 3, 2009. Two legislative chambers in two states held regularly-scheduled elections. These off-year elections coincided with other state and local elections, including gubernatorial elections in two states. Both chambers of the Northern Mariana Islands legislature were up, which remains the last time they were up in this class of elections. 

This remains the last time Democrats won more state legislative chambers and seats than Republicans.

Summary table 
Regularly-scheduled elections were held in 2 of the 99 state legislative chambers in the United States. Nationwide, regularly-scheduled elections were held for 180 of the 7,383 legislative seats. This table only covers regularly-scheduled elections; additional special elections took place concurrently with these regularly-scheduled elections.

State summaries

New Jersey 
All seats of the New Jersey General Assembly were up for election. Assembly members were elected to two-year terms in two-member districts. Democrats retained majority control, albeit a slightly reduced one.

Virginia 
All seats of the Virginia House of Delegates are up for election. Delegates are elected to two-year terms in single-member districts. Republicans expanded their majority.

Territoral Summaries

Northern Mariana Islands 
All seats of the Northern Mariana Islands House of Representatives and half of the Northern Mariana Islands Senate are up for election. Senators are elected to four-year terms and Representatives are elected to two-year terms.

See also
 2009 United States gubernatorial elections

Notes

References 

 
State legislative elections
State legislature elections in the United States by year